Love Story is a 2013 Chinese romantic comedy film directed by Guan Er and written by Liang Xiaoxiao and Zhu Bo, and stars Zhao Yihuan, Wang Yi, and Mo Xi'er. The film was released in China on 2 August 2013.

Cast
 Zhao Yihuan as Cao Aiai
 Wang Yi as Zhan Shao'ang
 Mo Xi'er as Su Man
 Chen Meihang as Hu Jingjing
 Qin Hanlei as Detective Qin 
 Dong Yufeng as Yan Lang
 You Yitian as Duan Bailu
 Zhao Yujing as Fei Lengcui

Music
 Zhao Yihuan - "Falling In Love"
 Zhao Yihuan - "Love"
 Zhao Yihuan - "Men Don't Credible"

Accolades

References

External links
 
 

Chinese romantic comedy films
Chinese sex comedy films
2013 romantic comedy films
2013 films
Films directed by Guan Er